Charles Glenn Ford (December 10, 1948 – August 24, 2022) was an American football cornerback in the National Football League (NFL) for the Chicago Bears, the Philadelphia Eagles, the Buffalo Bills, and the New York Giants.  He played college football at the University of Houston and was drafted in the second round of the 1971 NFL Draft.

References

1948 births
2022 deaths
American football cornerbacks
Buffalo Bills players
Chicago Bears players
Houston Cougars football players
New York Giants players
Philadelphia Eagles players
People from Beaumont, Texas